Patricia Naomi Akwashiki (born 2 November 1953) was elected Senator for the Nasarawa North Senatorial District of Nasarawa State, Nigeria, taking office on 29 May 2007. She is a member of the People's Democratic Party (PDP).

Akwashiki earned a BA in Education from Ahmadu Bello University, Zaria in 1982.
She entered the banking industry, where she became a senior manager.
She was elected to the 5th Assembly (2003–2007) of the House of Representatives on the People's Democratic Party (PDP) platform. She failed to win the PDP nomination to run for a second term, and transferred to the All Nigeria Peoples Party (ANPP), on which ticket she won election in 2007 as Senator for Nasarawa North.

After taking her seat in the Senate in May 2007, Akwashiki was appointed to committees on States & Local Government, Inter-Parliamentary Affairs, Communications, Banking, Insurance & Other Financial Institutions and Women and Youth.
In a mid-term evaluation of Senators in May 2009, ThisDay noted that she sponsored a bill to amend the Code of Conduct Bureau and contributed brilliantly to debate in plenary and committee assignments.
In January 2010 she returned to the PDP, citing injustice and insensitivity of the ANPP national secretariat and factional infighting in the state chapter of the party as reasons.
In March 2015, President Goodluck Jonathan appointed Senator Patricia Akwashiki as the Minister of Information.

After taking her seat in the Senate in May 2007, Akwashiki was appointed to committees on States & Local Government, Inter-Parliamentary Affairs, Communications, Banking, Insurance & Other Financial Institutions and Women and Youth. In a mid-term evaluation of Senators in May 2009, ThisDay noted that she sponsored a bill to amend the Code of Conduct Bureau and contributed brilliantly to debate in plenary and committee assignments. In January 2010 she returned to the PDP, citing injustice and insensitivity of the ANPP national secretariat and factional infighting in the state chapter of the party as reasons. In March 2015, President Goodluck Jonathan appointed Senator Patricia Akwashiki as the Minister of Information. After taking her seat in the Senate in May 2007, Akwashiki was appointed to committees on States & Local Government, Inter-Parliamentary Affairs, Communications, Banking, Insurance & Other Financial Institutions and Women and Youth. In a mid-term evaluation of Senators in May 2009, ThisDay noted that she sponsored a bill to amend the Code of Conduct Bureau and contributed brilliantly to debate in plenary and committee assignments. In January 2010 she returned to the PDP, citing injustice and insensitivity of the ANPP national secretariat and factional infighting in the state chapter of the party as reasons.

After taking her seat in the Senate in May 2007, Akwashiki was appointed to committees on States & Local Government, Inter-Parliamentary Affairs, Communications, Banking, Insurance & Other Financial Institutions and Women and Youth. In a mid-term evaluation of Senators in May 2009, ThisDay noted that she sponsored a bill to amend the Code of Conduct Bureau and contributed brilliantly to debate in plenary and committee assignments. In January 2010 she returned to the PDP, citing injustice and insensitivity of the ANPP national secretariat and factional infighting in the state chapter of the party as reasons. In March 2015, President Goodluck Jonathan appointed Senator Patricia Akwashiki as the Minister of Information.

In 2018 Akwashiki declared interest to run for governor of Nasarawa State predicting that she would be Nigeria's first elected female governor but failed to pick her party's ticket to run in the general election in 2019.

References

Living people
1953 births
People from Nasarawa State
Peoples Democratic Party members of the Senate (Nigeria)
Members of the House of Representatives (Nigeria)
21st-century Nigerian politicians
21st-century Nigerian women politicians
Information and communications ministers of Nigeria
Women government ministers of Nigeria